James Alexander Campanis (born February 9, 1944 in New York City), is a former professional ballplayer who played in the Major Leagues primarily as a catcher from 1966 to 1970 and 1973. Campanis batted and threw right-handed. His father, Al Campanis, also played in the Majors.

Campanis played for the Dodgers from 1966–68. He was traded along with Jackie Hernández and Bob Johnson from the Kansas City Royals to the Pittsburgh Pirates for Freddie Patek, Bruce Dal Canton and Jerry May at the Winter Meetings on December 2, 1970. He was working for the team in 1988 when the Dodgers won the World Series.

See also
List of second-generation Major League Baseball players

References

External links
, or Baseball Almanac, or Retrosheet, or Pelota Binaria (Venezuelan Winter League)

1944 births
Living people
Águilas Cibaeñas players
American expatriate baseball players in the Dominican Republic
Albuquerque Dodgers players
Albuquerque Dukes players
American people of Greek descent
Arizona Instructional League Dodgers players
Cardenales de Lara players
American expatriate baseball players in Venezuela
Charleston Charlies players
Elmira Pioneers players
Kansas City Royals players
Los Angeles Dodgers Legend Bureau
Los Angeles Dodgers players
Major League Baseball catchers
Omaha Royals players
Pittsburgh Pirates players
Salem Dodgers players
Seattle Angels players
Sherbrooke Pirates players
Spokane Indians players
Baseball players from New York City
St. Petersburg Saints players
Waterbury Pirates players
American expatriate baseball players in Nicaragua